Oliver Otis Anderson (November 16, 1879 – July 7, 1945) was an American professional baseball umpire.

Anderson played Minor League Baseball from 1897 to 1902. After his playing days, he became an umpire for the Northern League from 1903 to 1905. Anderson then umpired for the Ohio League, Western League, New York State League and American Association until  when he worked his only season in the Federal League. In 1914, he umpired 152 games, 81 of them as the Home Plate umpire. He died in Los Angeles, California in 1945.

References

External links

1879 births
1945 deaths
Major League Baseball umpires
Sportspeople from Los Angeles
People from Harvard, Illinois
Baseball people from Illinois
Baseball people from California